Lupine Essence is the debut studio album by the German melodic death metal band Suidakra.

Track listing

Personnel 
 Arkadius Antonik - vocals (harsh), guitars
 Marcel Schoenen - guitars, vocals (clean)
 Christoph Zacharowski - bass
 Stefan Möller - drums
 Daniela Voigt - keyboards, female vocals

Additional
 Torsten Pätzold - recording

External links 
 Track list and lyrics on suidakra.com

1997 albums
Suidakra albums